The Herbert classification is a system of categorizing scaphoid fractures.

Classification

References

Orthopedic classifications
Injuries of wrist and hand

External links